Man and Boy: Dada is a 2003 opera by Michael Nyman on a libretto by Michael Hastings. It tells the story of a friendship between aging dada artist Kurt Schwitters and a twelve-year-old boy. These two characters and the boy's mother make up the cast of the opera.

It was first performed at the Badisches Staatstheater in Karlsruhe, Germany, on 13 March 2004, directed by Robert Tannenbaum. It was then produced by the Almeida Opera on 15, 17 and 18 July 2004, in a production designed by Jeremy Herbert and directed by Lindsay Posner at Almeida Theatre.

The opera features an extensive use of oboe (rare in Nyman's work), mostly in the second act, to capture the feel of post-War popular music, somewhat reminiscent of Dmitri Shostakovich's Suite for Variety Orchestra.

Synopsis
Michael is a young boy on a bus who competes with an old man for bus tickets, which they both collect (as did Nyman as a child). The man turns out to be Kurt Schwitters, a dada artist who escaped Germany, although his wife has been killed and his son missing, and is facing deportation. They get to talking about their collections.  Schwitters invites Michael to come to his apartment to see them.  Michael refuses for obvious reasons, but asks what he does with them, and is told about merz collages.

Michael lives with his mother. His father was a night watchman whose body was never found when his building was struck by a German doodlebug bomb. Although Michael's mother hates all Germans, she makes an exception for the artist, who gradually earns her trust.  Michael and Kurt go to the British Museum together and deface a lion statue in a dada manner.

Michael's mother won't allow Kurt to visit while he is sick, and he gets interviewed by a BBC newswoman who likes to hear herself talk and makes sure that her pontifications get more air time than Kurt's corrections. She ends the interview by referring to dada as "dadaISM," with heavy emphasis on the "ism", and goes on quite a pace about Schwitters's references to his "art" rather than "anti-art", as the proponents of dada would have it.

Kurt spends more time with Michael and his mother. He repeatedly suggests that the two get married so that he can become a naturalized citizen, but she is not interested in him that way. He makes numerous mistakes. He offends her with a song about doodlebug bomb, but she agrees to hear it again, as the song was not at all intended to make fun of her husband. He makes a very large mistake at Michael's birthday. Michael wants a bicycle, but Kurt gives him a dada bike that cannot be ridden.  Michael's mother is horrified that he would do what she perceives as a practical joke to a boy. His motivation was completely different—he wanted to give Michael something special and unique. Kurt decides that he is too eccentric to get on with Michael and his mother. Michael tries to persuade him to stay, telling him that he appreciates the dada bike and can say to his friends that he crashed it.

Recording

The album, based on the Almeida production, was recorded in 2004 and released in 2005. It was the first release on Nyman's own label, MN Records, and his 48th release overall.

Track listing
Disc 1 – ACT ONE
SCENE 1 – You need a ticket to breathe the air
SCENE 2 – A few things I collect beside bus tickets
SCENE 3 – Any more fares please?
SCENE 4 – It's kind of interesting rubbish
SCENE 5 – Scarper!
SCENE 6 – Forty sheep and twenty reindeer?
SCENE 7 – Coughs and sneezes spread diseases
SCENE 8 – Except take a piss
SCENE 9 – Doodlebug

Disc 2 – ACT TWO
SCENE 10 – A Famous cup of British tea
SCENE 11 – This was a good one – Ponders End to Waterloo
SCENE 12 – I'm highly adept at the tango
SCENE 13 – Show me a bike!
SCENE 14 – Chuk persh szing!
SCENE 15 – Happy birthday, dear Michael!
SCENE 16 – I am having a trouble with hanky panky
SCENE 17 – Latin à la Hammersmith Palais
SCENE 18 – A hundred stops but they have no name
SCENE 19 – I was trying to explain something about Dada

Cast
John Graham-Hall (tenor): Kurt Schwitters
William Sheldon (boy soprano): Michael
Vivian Tierney (soprano):  Michael's mother/old woman/bus conductress/British Museum guard/BBC interviewer

Musicians
Michael Nyman Band
conducted by Paul McGrath
Gabrielle Lester, violin
Rebecca Hirsch, violin
Tony Hinnigan, cello
Paul Morgan, double bass
Melinda Maxwell, oboe
Gareth Hulse, oboe
Andrew Sparling, clarinet, bass clarinet
David Rix, clarinet, bass clarinet
David Roach, soprano, alto saxophone
Christopher Gunia, bassoon
Richard Benjafield, percussion
Dominic Saunders, piano

Crew
Composed and produced by Michael Nyman
Recorded, edited  and mixed by Austin Ince at Abbey Road Studios, London, October and November 2004.
Assistant engineer: Roland Heap
Assistant to Michael Nyman: Andy Keenan
Mastered by Peter Mew at Abbey Road Studios, December 2004
Music published by Chester Music Ltd./Michael Nyman Ltd., 2004
Libretto © Michael Hastings, 2004
(The librettist gratefully acknowledges contributions and alterations to the text by Victoria Hardie)
Designed by Russell Mills (shed) 
Co-designed by Michael Webster (storm)
Portrait of Kurt Schwitters, '1924', photographer, Eli Lissitsky (courtesy of the Sprengel Museum, Hanover)
Kurt Schwitters, Gerd Strindberg and Edith Thomas (?) in the garden of the house in Barnes, London, 1941/1943 photographer: Kurt and Ernest Scwitters Stiftung, Hanover
Production photos by Michael Nyman
Design imagery by Jeremy Herbert and Steven Williams
Special thanks to Elizabeth Lloyd, Rachel Thomas, John Fosbrook, Gill Graham, James Rushton, Nicholas Hare, James Ware, Declan Colgan, Robert Tannenbaum, Achim Thorwald, Patrick Dickie, Phillippa Cole, Jeremy Herbert, Lindsay Posner, Sarah Wilson, Jeremy Bines, Alexander Balanescu, Annette Gentz, Colette Barber & Lucy Launder at Abbey Road, Karin Orchard at the Kurt Schwitters Archiv, Sprengel Museum, Hanover

References

External links
Man and Boy: Dada at Chester Novello Music
Man and Boy: Dada at MN Records
Anne Midgette, "Schwitters Agonistes: Opera Takes on a Radical", The New York Times, 18 December 2004.

Fictional duos
Operas
Operas by Michael Nyman